The year 1920 was marked, in science fiction, by the following events.

Births and deaths

Births 
 January 2: Isaac Asimov, American writer, (died 1992).
 May 9:
William Tenn, American writer (died 2010)
Richard George Adams, British writer (died 2016)
 June 13: Walter Ernsting, German writer, (died 2005)
 August 22: Ray Bradbury, American writer (died 2012)
 October 8: Frank Herbert, American writer (died 1986)
 Peter Phillips, British writer (died 2012)

Deaths

Events

Awards 
The main science-fiction Awards known at the present time did not exist at this time.

Literary releases

Novels 
 We, novel by Yevgeny Zamyatin.
 A Voyage to Arcturus, novel by David Lindsay.
  Le Formidable Événement, novel by Maurice Leblanc.
 City of Endless Night, novel by Milo Hastings.

Stories collections

Short stories 
The Comet, short story by W. E. B. Du Bois

Comics

Audiovisual outputs

Movies 
 Algol, by Hans Werckmeister.
 The Head of Janus, by Friedrich Wilhelm Murnau.

See also 
 1920 in science
 1919 in science fiction
 1921 in science fiction

References

Science fiction by year

science-fiction